Jefari Odeny Owiti (born 17 November 1998) is a Kenyan international footballer who plays for Chemelil Sugar, as a striker.

Career
Owiti has played club football for Chemelil Sugar.

He made his international debut for Kenya in 2016.

References

1998 births
Living people
Kenyan footballers
Kenya international footballers
Chemelil Sugar F.C. players
Kenyan Premier League players
Association football forwards